Sulzfeld (South Franconian: Sulsfeld) is a municipality in the district of Karlsruhe in Baden-Württemberg in Germany.

References

Karlsruhe (district)